Leah Harvey (born around 1993) is a British actor. They are known for their role as Salvor Hardin in the 2021 Apple TV+ series Foundation, which earned them a BAFTA nomination. On stage, they starred as Hortense in a 2019 National Theatre production of Small Island, and as Lisa in a 2022 Theatre Royal Stratford East production of The Wonderful World of Dissocia. They have been cast in the upcoming A24 film Tuesday.

Early and personal life
Harvey grew up in Upton Park, East London. They attended the Brampton Manor Academy while taking dance and drama classes at the Deborah Day Theatre School Trust on a scholarship. They went on to graduate with a Bachelor of Arts from the London Academy of Music and Dramatic Art. 

Harvey is non-binary and prefers they/them pronouns.

References

External links

Living people
1990s births
British people of Jamaican descent
Alumni of the London Academy of Music and Dramatic Art
Black British actors
British non-binary actors
LGBT Black British people
People from Upton Park, London
Actors from London
English LGBT actors